Tavares may refer to:

Places

Brazil 
Tavares, Paraíba
Tavares, Rio Grande do Sul
Rodovia Raposo Tavares, the longest highway in São Paulo
Tavares Bastos (favela), a favela in Rio de Janeiro, Brazil
Tavares River

Jamaica 
Tavares Gardens, Kingston, Jamaica

Portugal 
Chãs de Tavares, Mangualde
Travanca de Tavares, Mangualde
Várzea de Tavares, Mangualde

United States 
Tavares, Florida
Tavares, Orlando and Atlantic Railroad

Other
Tavares (group), an American soul music group
Tavares (restaurant), one of the oldest restaurants in the world, in Lisbon, Portugal
Tavares (surname)
Tavares, a variety of limequat tree
Tavares, a type of soil